Christopher Jacob Abbott (born February 10, 1986) is an American actor known for his work in independent films.
 
In 2011, Abbott made his feature film debut in Martha Marcy May Marlene and his Broadway debut in the revival of the play The House of Blue Leaves. He gained attention for his role in the HBO comedy-drama series Girls. He had a supporting role in the drama A Most Violent Year (2014) and received critical acclaim and a nomination for the Independent Spirit Award for Best Male Lead for his starring role in James White (2015). Abbott received praise for his role in the horror films It Comes at Night (2017) and Piercing (2018). He portrayed astronaut David Scott in the film First Man (2018). He also portrayed John Yossarian as the lead role in the 2019 miniseries Catch-22 based on the Joseph Heller novel of the same name, for which he was nominated for the Golden Globe Award for Best Actor – Miniseries or Television Film. 

Abbott continued to receive praise for his starring roles in the horror film  Possessor (2020), On the Count of Three (2021).

Early life and education
Abbott was born in Greenwich, Connecticut, the son of Anna (née Servidio) and Orville Abbott. He has an older sister, Christina. Abbott's maternal grandmother Angelina, was born in Rosà, a town in the province of Vicenza, Veneto, Italy.  He has described himself as being a "Euro-mutt", with distant Portuguese and Eastern European ancestry. He spent his early years in Chickahominy, a working-class, heavily Italian-American neighborhood in Greenwich, and grew up in Stamford. Abbott worked at a local video store and at his friend's wine store. He attended Norwalk Community College shortly before he began studying acting at HB Studio. He moved to New York City in 2006 to be closer to school.

Career

2008–2012: Early career
After moving to New York, Abbott began going to big open calls for plays while in school. This is how Abbott got his two first acting jobs, Off-Broadway. The first play, Good Boys and True, opened in the spring of 2008 and was written by Roberto Aguirre-Sacasa and directed by Scott Ellis. It followed a scandal at a prep school. Abbott played the lead character's (Brian J. Smith) gay best friend, Justin. The second play, Mouth to Mouth, opened in the fall of 2008. The play depicted the limits of friendship and family, and was written by Kevin Elyot and directed by Mark Brokaw. Abbott played the sympathetic 15-year-old son of Laura (Lisa Emery). Abbott received positive reviews for both productions. He followed this with guest-starring roles in the comedy series Nurse Jackie and the police procedural series Law & Order: Criminal Intent . In 2010, Abbott co-starred opposite Cristin Milioti and Laila Robins in the play That Face at the Manhattan Theatre Club.

Abbott made his feature film debut in the 2011 drama thriller Martha Marcy May Marlene opposite Elizabeth Olsen. Written and directed by Sean Durkin, the film premiered at the 2011 Sundance Film Festival in January, and had a limited release in the United States on October 21, 2011. It was met with positive reviews. The same year, Abbott made his Broadway debut in the revival of the play The House of Blue Leaves opposite Ben Stiller and Edie Falco. Directed by David Cromer, the play opened in April 2011. Abbott played the part of the sullen, recently drafted son, Ronnie Shaughnessy, for which Abbott received positive reviews.

2012–present: Girls and film roles
In 2012, Abbott co-starred opposite Melanie Lynskey in the comedy-drama film Hello I Must Be Going. The film premiered at the 2012 Sundance Film Festival, and was released theatrically in the United States on September 7, 2012. Critic Roger Ebert praised the film and Abbott's performance. Abbott gained public recognition for his role as the sweet, docile boyfriend of Marnie (Allison Williams), Charlie Dattolo in the HBO comedy-drama series Girls. Created by Lena Dunham, the series premiered on April 15, 2012. Abbott decided to quit the series after season two's finale which left the fans of the series in shock. Abbott stated that the reason why he left was because he couldn't relate to the character. Before leaving Girls, Abbott starred in a series of short films opposite model-actress Sheila Márquez for Free People and guest-starred in an episode of the comedy-drama series Enlightened opposite Luke Wilson.

After leaving the series, Abbott returned to the theatre in the fall of 2013 in the play Where We're Born by Lucy Thurber at the Rattlestick Playwrights Theater. The Jackson Gay-directed play featured Abbott opposite a cast that included Betty Gilpin. Abbott received positive reviews for his role as Tony. In 2014, Abbott  co-starred in the drama film The Sleepwalker, co-written by his good friend Brady Corbet. It premiered in-competition in the US Dramatic Category at 2014 Sundance Film Festival on January 20, 2014. It was met with mixed to positive reviews. Abbott also co-starred opposite Sam Rockwell and Nina Arianda in the 2014 production of Sam Shepard's play Fool for Love at the Williamstown Theatre Festival. Abbott received positive reviews for his performance in the Daniel Aukin-directed play. In his second film of 2014, Abbott played the supporting role of Louis Servidio in J. C. Chandor's crime drama film A Most Violent Year. Starring Oscar Isaac and Jessica Chastain, the film had its world premiere at the AFI Fest on November 6, 2014 at the Dolby Theatre in Hollywood and received a limited release on December 31, 2014.

In the Fall of 2015, Abbott played Elias Schreiber-Hoffman in the Annie Baker play John opposite Georgia Engel and Lois Smith. Directed by Sam Gold, the play took place at the Signature Theatre. Abbott's performance received positive reviews and the play was chosen as one of the best plays of 2015 by The New York Times. Abbott starred as the title character in the drama James White opposite Cynthia Nixon, directed by Josh Mond. The film premiered at the Sundance Film Festival on January 23, 2015 and received a theatrical limited release on November 13, 2015. It was met with positive reviews and Abbott received a nomination for the Independent Spirit Award for Best Male Lead.

In 2016, Abbott co-starred in the comedy war film Whiskey Tango Foxtrot, opposite Tina Fey and Martin Freeman, released on March 4, 2016. Abbott also returned for an episode of Girls, in the series' fifth season. The episode was critically acclaimed and lauded as one of the series' best episodes ever. In the summer of 2016, Abbott co-starred opposite Marisa Tomei in the Trip-Cullman production of Tennessee Williams' play The Rose Tattoo at the Williamstown Theatre Festival, for which Abbott received positive reviews. Abbott co-starred opposite Olivia Cooke in the American independent drama film Katie Says Goodbye, which premiered at the 2016 Toronto International Film Festival.

Abbott starred alongside Joel Edgerton and Riley Keough in Trey Edward Shults's horror film It Comes at Night, which was released on June 9, 2017. He co-starred in Jamie M. Dagg's 2017 thriller Sweet Virginia, opposite Jon Bernthal, Imogen Poots and Rosemarie DeWitt. He also co-starred opposite Jessica Biel and Bill Pullman in the television series The Sinner, which debuted in 2017. Abbott also starred opposite Mia Wasikowska in Nicolas Pesce's film Piercing (2018), based on the novel of the same name.

Upcoming projects
Abbott will next star in John Michael McDonagh's The Forgiven, Zachary Wigon's second feature film Sanctuary, and Yorgos Lanthimos' Poor Things. He is also set to make his television return as Stan in the Apple TV+ anthology series The Crowded Room, alongside Tom Holland and Amanda Seyfried. Filming of the series had begun by March 31, 2022 in New York City. The same month, he joined Aaron Taylor-Johnson in Kraven the Hunter as the film's main villain, which was reported to be the Foreigner. Principal photography began on March 20, 2022.

In February 2022, it was announced that Abbott would reteam John Michael McDonagh in Fear Is The Rider, co-starring Abbey Lee. In May 2022, he signed to star in Justin Anderson’s directorial debut Swimming Home, an adaptation of the Booker Prize-nominated novel of the same name by Deborah Levy. He is also set to voice Reed, an art dealer, in the upcoming adult animated music television series based on the upcoming album of the same name by American musician and actor Kid Cudi. The series will premiere on Netflix.

Personal life
Abbott lives in New York. Abbott considers John Cassavetes to be the model for the type of creative life he would like to emulate.

Filmography

Film

Television

Theatre

Awards and nominations

References

External links
 

1986 births
Living people
21st-century American male actors
American male television actors
American male film actors
American male stage actors
American male voice actors
Male actors from Greenwich, Connecticut
Male actors from New York City
American people of Italian descent
American people of Portuguese descent